Victoria Benítez Rodríguez (born 9 September 2000) is a Spanish footballer who plays as a defender for Real Betis.

Club career
Vicky Benítez started her career at Sevilla's academy.

References

External links
Profile at La Liga

2000 births
Living people
Women's association football defenders
Spanish women's footballers
Footballers from Seville
Sevilla FC (women) players
Real Oviedo (women) players
Real Betis Féminas players
Primera División (women) players
Segunda Federación (women) players
21st-century Spanish women